The  Income Tax Air Intelligence Unit is a law enforcement agency, under the Ministry of Finance responsible for handling tax evasion and cross-border illegal trade in India in airports in consultation with the Central Board of Indirect Taxes and Customs and the CISF. It functions under the Zonal Deputy Director (Intelligence) Income Tax. The agency functions under the rules prescribed by its parent organisation to handle any intimidation in course of their new duty of checking and gathering intelligence on tax evasion in airports. Their mandate will soon be extended to Ports. The Election Commission of India has congratulated this agency on their path breaking efforts to fight tax evasion among politicians.

See also
 Indian Revenue Service
 Directorate General of Income Tax Investigation
 Directorate of Income Tax Intelligence and Criminal Investigation
 Chief Commissioner of Income Tax Central
 Directorate of Revenue Intelligence
 Central Economic Intelligence Bureau

References 

Income tax in India
Tax evasion in India